SMSD can refer to:
 Shawnee Mission School District
 South Middleton School District
 Stafford Municipal School District